Daniel James Lewis (21 June 1909 – 7 October 1980) was a Welsh professional footballer. He played as a full back in the English Football League for Watford from 1931 until 1939, when football was suspended due to the Second World War. During the final five league seasons, Lewis played regularly as Watford consistently finished in the top six positions in the Third Division South, and won the 1937 Third Division South Cup. He made a total of 124 Watford appearances in peacetime competitions, and a further 72 in wartime ones.

References

1909 births
1980 deaths
Welsh footballers
People from Glamorgan
English Football League players
Association football fullbacks
Watford F.C. players
People from Troed-y-rhiw
Sportspeople from Merthyr Tydfil County Borough